Dancing Shadows is the fifth studio album from American singer and songwriter Mario, released on October 5, 2018. The release of the album marks the first under the singer's own imprint New Citizen Music, in partnership with EMPIRE Distribution. Dancing Shadows is the first project by the singer that features his own songwriting on every track.

The album serves as a follow-up to his fourth album D.N.A. (2009) and his first studio effort in almost a decade. It was executive produced by Mario  and English producer Jake Gosling, with additional producers xSDTRK, Daecolm, Pham, J Warner, P2J and Ryan McDermott.

The album's lead single, "Drowning" was released on July 20, 2018, along with the accompanying music video, while the second single, "Dancing Shadows" was released on September 14, 2018 and also includes an accompanying music video.

The album didn't make an impact on the US Billboard 200. To further promote the album, Mario appeared as an opening act for B2K on The Millennium Tour.

Background and development
In August 2011, RCA Music Group announced it was disbanding J Records along with Arista Records and Jive Records. With the shutdown, Mario, and all other artists previously signed to these three labels, will release his future albums on the RCA Records label.

During his appearance on BET's 106 & Park on July 10, 2013 to premiere, the video for "Somebody Else", Mario stated that he felt the album recorded with Rico Love did not feel part of his career plan and that he scrapped that album and went on to record his then-titled album Evolve, which was set to be released on September 17, 2013. The album was not released, and Mario left RCA Records in 2015.

In mid-2015, Mario announced that he has reunited with Scott Storch, who produced his 2004 hit "Let Me Love You", on a new album, titled Never 2 Late for a song called "Enemy", that ended up being finished by Chris Brown and published on his acclaimed album Heartbreak on a Full Moon. The album was scheduled to be released on November 27, 2015, but was pushed to December 4, 2015, but the album was not released.

On May 6, 2016, Mario premiered and released the single "I Need More". On December 13, 2016, he released the single "Let Me Help You". On June 16, 2017, he released the single "Pain is the New Pleasure". A remixed version of "Let Me Help You" featuring Jamaican recording artist Konshens was released on August 18, 2017.

In mid-2018, Mario spoke with the FunX radio station during the Oh My! Music Festival in June 2018, announcing that the album's final title was Dancing Shadows and would be released later in 2018 with a new single called "Drowning": "We changed the name of it. Making an album is like giving birth to something. You go through different names and different vibes."

Following the release of the second single, "Dancing Shadows", and its accompanying music video, the album's cover art, release date and tracklist were revealed.

Singles 
"Drowning", was released on July 20, 2018, as the album's first single and was accompanied by its music video. The song has peaked at number 30 on the US Adult R&B Songs chart and later peaked at number 28.

The title track "Dancing Shadows" was issued as the album's second single on September 14, 2018, alongside its music video.

"Care for You" was released alongside its music video on March 15, 2019, as the third single from the album. The music video was directed by Khufu Najee.

The music video for the track "Goes Like That" premiered on October 4, 2018. The remix version by GXNXVS was released on August 2, 2019.

Track listing 
Credits are adapted from the album's liner notes and Tidal.

Notes
  signifies a co-producer
  signifies an additional producer
 "Good Times" originally didn’t feature credited vocals by Buddy Guy.
 "One Man Woman" features background vocals from Felicia Fury.

Charts

Release history

References

2018 albums
Mario (American singer) albums
Albums produced by Jake Gosling
Empire Distribution albums